Telurips dubius is a species of moth of the family Tortricidae. It is found in Peru.

The wingspan is 15–17 mm. The ground colour of the forewings is pale brownish with brownish suffusions, veins and strigulation (fine streaks). The markings are brown. The hindwings are dirty cream mixed with pale brownish posteriorly.

Etymology
The species name refers to the doubtful position of this species and is derived from Latin dubius (meaning doubtful).

References

Moths described in 2010
Euliini
Moths of South America
Taxa named by Józef Razowski